Mark A. Brandenburg (born 1955) was the Iowa State Representative from the 15th District. A Republican, he served in the Iowa House of Representatives from 2011 to 2015. Brandenburg was born, raised, and resides in Council Bluffs, Iowa. He has an A.A. in mathematics from Iowa Western Community College, where he later taught, and a B.S. in human resource management from Bellevue University.

Brandenburg served on several committees in the Iowa House – the Judiciary, Public Safety, and Veterans Affairs committees. He also served as the vice chair of the Commerce committee and as a member of the Justice System Appropriations Subcommittee.

Biography
Mark Brandenburg is a lifelong resident of Council Bluffs.

Electoral history
*incumbent

References

External links

Representative Mark Brandenburg official Iowa General Assembly site
 

1955 births
Living people
Iowa Western Community College alumni
Bellevue University alumni
Republican Party members of the Iowa House of Representatives
Politicians from Council Bluffs, Iowa